Adrian Proteasa (born 1 March 1959) is a retired Romanian high jumper.

Proteasa won the bronze medal at the 1980 European Indoor Championships and finished seventh at the 1980 Olympic Games. He became national champion five times in a row, from 1977 through 1981.

His personal best jump outdoors was 2.26 metres, achieved in July 1980 in Bucharest.
 On the indoor track he jumped 2.29 metres, in Sindelfingen 1980.

Proteasa is currently a high jumping coach based in Norway.

References

1959 births
Living people
Romanian male high jumpers
Athletes (track and field) at the 1980 Summer Olympics
Olympic athletes of Romania
Romanian athletics coaches